Michael Bakunin is a biography of the Russian anarchist Mikhail Bakunin written by E. H. Carr and published by the Macmillan Company in 1937.

Further reading 

 
 
 
 
 
 Nettlau, Max. "An English Life of Bakunin." Spain and the World 2,27/28/29/30 (Jan 5, Jan 21, Feb 2, Feb 18, 1938).
 
 
 
 
  Originally in The New Republic, December 7, 1938, pp. 137–139.

1937 non-fiction books
Macmillan Publishers books
English-language books
Biographies about anarchists
Mikhail Bakunin
Russian biographies